Høylandet is a municipality in Trøndelag county, Norway. It is part of the Namdalen region. The administrative centre of the municipality is the village of Høylandet. Other villages include Kongsmoen and Vassbotna.

The  municipality is the 150th largest by area out of the 356 municipalities in Norway. Høylandet is the 319th most populous municipality in Norway with a population of 1,193.

General information
The municipality of Høylandet was established on 1 January 1901 when it was separated from the large municipality of Grong. Initially, the population of Høylandet was 1,046. During the 1960s, there were many municipal mergers across Norway due to the work of the Schei Committee. On 1 January 1964, the Kongsmoen area (population: 221) of eastern Foldereid municipality was merged into Høylandet. On that same date the Galguften and Hauknes areas (population: 15) were transferred from Høylandet to neighboring Overhalla municipality.  On 1 January 2018, the municipality switched from the old Nord-Trøndelag county to the new Trøndelag county.

Name
The municipality (originally the parish) is named Høylandet. Thus it means "the land/region where they grow hay". The name was historically spelled Hølandet or Høilandet.

Coat of arms
The coat of arms was granted on 2 January 1990. The official blazon is "Vert, a swan argent rousant, armed sable". This means the arms have a green field (background) and the charge is a whooper swan (Cygnus cygnus). The swan has a tincture of argent which means it is commonly colored white, but if it is made out of metal, then silver is used. The swan is also armed, which means the feet and beak are black. This design was chosen to symbolize of the large number of these swans that migrate through the area each year. The arms were designed by Einar H. Skjervold.

Churches
The Church of Norway has one parish within the municipality of Høylandet. It is part of the Namdal prosti (deanery) in the Diocese of Nidaros.

Geography
There are several large lakes in Høylandet including Almåsgrønningen, Eidsvatnet, Grungstadvatnet, Øyvatnet, and Storgrønningen. The innermost part of the Foldafjord is located in northern Høylandet. Norwegian County Road 17 runs through the municipality from south to north through the central valley.

Government
All municipalities in Norway, including Høylandet, are responsible for primary education (through 10th grade), outpatient health services, senior citizen services, unemployment and other social services, zoning, economic development, and municipal roads. The municipality is governed by a municipal council of elected representatives, which in turn elect a mayor.  The municipality falls under the Trøndelag District Court and the Frostating Court of Appeal.

Municipal council
The municipal council of Høylandet is made up of 19 representatives that are elected to four year terms. The party breakdown of the council is as follows:

Mayors
The mayors of Høylandet:

1901–1916: Lorents Mørkved (V)
1917–1922: Alexander Almaas (V)
1923–1925: Ole P. Skarland 	
1926–1932: Anders L. Mørkved (V)
1933–1934: Knut Mørkved (Bp)  
1935–1940: Martin Mørkved (V)
1941–1945: Knut Mørkved (NS)
1945–1963: Martin Mørkved (V)
1964–1983: Gunnleif Elden (Sp)
1984–1991: Ole Flakken (Sp)
1992–1993: Lars Otto Okstad (Sp)
1994–1995: Hildbjørn Brøndbo (Ap)
1995–2011: Lars Otto Okstad (Sp)
2011–present: Hege Nordheim-Viken (Sp)

Notable people 
 Lorents Mørkved (1844 in Markved – 1924) a farmer and politician, Mayor of Høilandet for 16 years
 Ivar Aavatsmark (1864 in Høylandet – 1947) a Norwegian officer, politician & Govt. minister
 Salamon Mørkved (1891 in Høylandet – 1978) a Norwegian forester and politician
 Ivar Skarland (1899 in Høylandet – 1965) a Norwegian anthropologist
 Pål Tyldum (1942 -) Norwegian cross country skier

References

External links

Municipal fact sheet from Statistics Norway 

 
Municipalities of Trøndelag
1901 establishments in Norway